Sam Cobean (December 28, 1913 in Gettysburg, Pennsylvania – July 2, 1951 in Schuyler County, New York) was a cartoonist, especially known for his work in The New Yorker in the 1940s and 1950s.

His book of cartoons, The Naked Eye, has been published around the world.  Likewise, the book published after his death, The Cartoons of Cobean has enjoyed worldwide popularity since its publication in 1952. Copies of his books are still actively traded by his fans.

A close friend and co-worker with cartoonist Charles Addams (The Addams Family), Sam Cobean has influenced cartoons and cartoonists for several generations.  His particular contribution to the art of cartooning was his "dream bubble" or "thought bubble," wherein he revealed what the characters in his cartoons were actually thinking, e.g. the man looking at a beautiful woman and seeing her in the nude.

Cobean created humor that truly transcends the barriers of language, culture, race and even time.  He was killed driving his Jaguar when he rear-ended another vehicle.  His passenger Cameron Argetsinger, founder of Watkins Glen racing, was injured.

References

External links
Sam Cobean's World

The New Yorker cartoonists
1913 births
1951 deaths